Nam-gu, or "Southern District," is the name of a gu in several South Korean cities:

Nam-gu, Busan
Nam-gu, Daegu
Nam-gu, Gwangju
Nam-gu, Incheon
Nam-gu, Pohang
Nam-gu, Ulsan